Andorra competed at the 2015 World Championships in Athletics in Beijing, China, from 22 to 30 August 2015.

Results
(q – qualified, NM – no mark, SB – season best)

Women
Field events

Sources 
Andorra team 

Nations at the 2015 World Championships in Athletics
World Championships in Athletics
2015